James Rappaport (born 1956) is a  real estate developer, entrepreneur, attorney, philanthropist, and Republican politician from Massachusetts.

Personal life
Educated at the Wharton School of Business and Boston University School of Law, he lives with his wife in Boston, Massachusetts. and Sedona, Arizona.

Political career
Rappaport's career began as a Concord real estate developer, a successful occupation that largely enabled him to self-finance in his 1990 Senate attempt against Senator John Kerry. Though the polls showed early on that Rappaport, a GOP start-up, had a shot at the Senator, the campaign fizzled out by November, and he ended up losing by 13%. Rappaport was then elected as the Massachusetts Republican Party Chairman, a position he would hold from 1992 to 1997. After being rumored as a possible Lt. Governor to then-Governor Jane Swift, Rappaport jumped in the Lt. Governor's race in 2002, only to then be beaten by Mitt Romney's hand-chosen running-mate, Kerry Healey.

Current activities
Rappaport remains actively involved in numerous civic and charitable organizations, including serving in a number of leadership positions for the Combined Jewish Philanthropies. He is also a member of the Board of Trustees for the Dana Farber Cancer Institute  as well as the Board of Overseers of Boston's Children's Hospital.  He is the co-founder and Chairman of the Board of Specialty Hospitals America (SHA), LLC.

See also 
 United States Senate election in Massachusetts, 1990

References

External links

1956 births
American people of Romanian-Jewish descent
Jewish American people in Massachusetts politics
Wharton School of the University of Pennsylvania alumni
Boston University School of Law alumni
Living people
Massachusetts Republican Party chairs
People from Concord, Massachusetts
21st-century American Jews